Binaghia concii is a species of beetle in the genus Binaghia. It was described in 1943.

References

Mordellinae
Beetles described in 1943